The John F. Kennedy Expressway is a nearly  freeway in Chicago, Illinois, United States. Portions of the freeway carry I-190, I-90 and I-94. The freeway runs in a southeast–northwest direction between the central city neighborhood of the West Loop and O'Hare International Airport. The highway was named in commemoration of 35th US President John F. Kennedy. It conforms to the Chicago-area term of using the word expressway for an Interstate Highway without tolls. The Kennedy's official endpoints are the Jane Byrne Interchange with Interstate 290 (Eisenhower Expressway/Ida B. Wells Drive) and the Dan Ryan Expressway (also I-90/94) at the east end, and the O'Hare Airport terminals at the west end.

Traveling eastbound from O'Hare, the Kennedy interchanges with the eastern terminus of the Jane Addams Memorial Tollway (I-90) and with the Tri-State Tollway (I-294) at a complex junction just west of Illinois Route 171 (IL 171, Cumberland Avenue). The Kennedy later merges with the southern end of the Edens Expressway (I-94) at Montrose Avenue; the Kennedy (at this point both I-90 and I-94) then turns south to its junction with the Dan Ryan and Eisenhower Expressways and Ida B. Wells Drive at the Jane Byrne Interchange in downtown Chicago.

With up to 327,000 vehicles traveling on the Kennedy daily, the Kennedy and its South Side extension, the Dan Ryan, are the busiest roads in the Midwest.

History

The Kennedy was originally constructed along the route of Avondale Avenue, an existing diagonal street, and the C&NW Northwest Line corridor, in the late 1950s and completed on November 5, 1960. Originally named the Northwest Expressway for its general direction of travel, the Chicago City Council voted unanimously on November 29, 1963—one week after the assassination of President Kennedy—to rename the highway the John F. Kennedy Expressway. Until 1978, the Kennedy Expressway was marked as I-94 and Illinois Route 194 (IL 194), I-90 and I-190 replaced IL 194 and thus the Eisenhower Expressway was renamed from I-90 to I-290.

The express portion of the freeway was last reconstructed from 1992 through 1994, when the existing express lanes, which previously were reversed by hand, were modernized. In addition, all aspects of the express lanes system were computerized, so that the process could be controlled at both ends from a central location. At least once a day, however, IDOT crews still examine the express lanes for debris while the lanes are closed.

In 2005, the Washington Street bridge over the expressway was reconstructed, and the entrance ramps to both directions of the Kennedy were partially removed. The same was done in 2006 for the Monroe Street bridge. This left a disconnected portion of each ramp remaining on the expressway, to be removed and the existing "suicide ramps" lengths extended when funding became available. The American Recovery and Reinvestment Act of 2009 provided the necessary funding for the construction between Hubbard Street and the Circle Interchange, commencing in summer 2009. The westbound (facing north) ramps at Adams Street and Madison Street, along with the eastbound (facing south) ramps at Randolph Street and Madison Street, were lengthened by removing what remained of abandoned ramps and lengthening the entrance ramps significantly. The only remaining short, limited-sight, left-side suicide ramp entrance is from Lake Street to the eastbound expressway (heading south). As part of the project, eastbound (heading south) traffic patterns were adjusted. The two right-most lanes were made "exit only" for Chicago Loop, Ida B. Wells Drive, and Eisenhower Expressway exits, the Adams Street and Jackson Boulevard exits were combined, certain center median walls reconstructed, lanes restriped to remove the merging of the leftmost lanes, and appropriate signage changes. In the westbound direction (headed north), the exit ramp to Monroe Street was permanently removed.

Features
The first section, an extension from Logan Square to Jefferson Park, opened in 1970. The second section opened between Jefferson Park and River Road (now Rosemont) in February 1983. The third and final section between River Road and O'Hare was opened in September 1984.

The second distinct features of the Kennedy Expressway are its reversible express lanes where I-94 merges into I-90. These reversible lanes, situated between the inbound lanes and the Blue Line tracks, allow two lanes of traffic to flow towards or away from the city, depending on the time of the day. The lanes are controlled by computers and verified by humans at a separate control center. Steel mesh barriers and breakaway gates prevent traffic from entering oncoming lanes. On January 25, 2014, a drunk driver broke through the safety gates and drove in the express lanes in the wrong direction, but was stopped by a snow plow; no injuries were reported. This was the first wrong-way accident involving the express lanes.

A third distinct feature is Hubbard's Cave, also called the Hubbard Street Tunnel, which passes under several streets and the Metra's Union Pacific West, North Central Service, Milwaukee District North, and Milwaukee District West lines (former Chicago & Northwestern and Milwaukee Road commuter lines respectively). It is named for Hubbard Street, one of the streets it passes underneath. Hubbard's Cave is a landmark frequently heard in traffic reports on radio and TV.

Known as the "suicide ramps", the entrance ramps on the left had little to no acceleration zone, and traffic on the ramps could not see mainline traffic until the last  of the ramp. The 2009–10 reconstruction between Hubbard Street and the Circle Interchange improved safety by increasing the lengths of most entrance ramps and reduced bottlenecks by better utilizing the existing space.

The Kennedy Expressway was the location of a large Magikist lips flashing sign which was a Chicago pop culture icon for many years. Located at the southeast corner where Montrose Avenue abutted the expressway, the sign was torn down in 2004.

Exit list

See also
 List of memorials to John F. Kennedy

References

External links

 John F. Kennedy Expressway (I-90 and I-94) at Steve Anderson's ChicagoRoads.com
 Historic, Current & Average Travel Times For The Kennedy Expressway

Interstate 90
Interstate 94
1960 establishments in Illinois
Expressways in the Chicago area
Wrong-way driving
Monuments and memorials to John F. Kennedy in the United States